Eloy Municipal Airport  is a public use non-towered airport located  northwest of the central business district of Eloy, a city in Pinal County, Arizona, United States.

Although most U.S. airports use the same three-letter location identifier for the FAA, IATA, and ICAO this airport is only assigned  E60 by the FAA.

The airport was opened in February 1969.

Since 1991 the airport has been home to Skydive Arizona, operating the largest skydiving center in the world with a fleet of four Twin Otters, seven Skyvans, and one Douglas DC-3.

Facilities and aircraft 
It has one asphalt runway:
 2/20 measuring 

For the 12-month period ending April 20, 2017, the airport had 30,000 aircraft operations, an average of 82 per day: 99.5% general aviation and 0.5% military. At that time there were 22 aircraft based at this airport: 55% single-engine, 10% ultralight, 35% multi-engine, no jet, and no helicopters.

References

External links 
 Skydive Arizona
 Official site
 

Airports established in 1969
Airports in Pinal County, Arizona
Transportation in Pinal County, Arizona